Umedalens IF a sports club in Umeå, Sweden formed on 12 January 1935 by the merger of Grubbs NS and Backens SK. Gunnar Lindahl was elected president. On 21 January 1935, the decision was taken to be a member of the Swedish Sports Confederation, the Swedish Ski Association, the Swedish Gymnastics Federation and the Swedish Football Association.

The football team of Umedalens IF currently plays in Division 2 Norrland. The club is affiliated to the Västerbottens Fotbollförbund.

Season to season

Attendances

In recent seasons Umedalens IF have had the following average attendances:

Players 2013

References

External links
Umedalens IF Official Website
Umedalens IF – Div 2 Norrland

Sport in Umeå
Football clubs in Västerbotten County
Association football clubs established in 1935
1935 establishments in Sweden